Alpha Centauri (α Centauri, Alpha Cen, or α Cen) is a triple star system in the southern constellation of Centaurus. It consists of 3 stars: Rigil Kentaurus (Alpha Centauri A), Toliman (B) and Proxima Centauri (C). Proxima Centauri is also the closest star to the Sun at 4.2465 light-years (1.3020 pc).

Alpha Centauri A and B are Sun-like stars (Class G and K, respectively), and together they form the binary star system Alpha Centauri AB. To the naked eye, the two main components appear to be a single star with an apparent magnitude of −0.27. It is the brightest star in the constellation and the third-brightest in the night sky, outshone only by Sirius and Canopus.

Alpha Centauri A has 1.1 times the mass and 1.5 times the luminosity of the Sun, while Alpha Centauri B is smaller and cooler, at 0.9 times the Sun's mass and less than 0.5 times its luminosity. The pair orbit around a common centre with an orbital period of 79 years. Their elliptical orbit is eccentric, so that the distance between A and B varies from 35.6 astronomical units (AU), or about the distance between Pluto and the Sun, to 11.2 AU, or about the distance between Saturn and the Sun.

Alpha Centauri C, or Proxima Centauri, is a small faint red dwarf (Class M).

Proxima Centauri has two confirmed planets: Proxima b, an Earth-sized planet in the habitable zone discovered in 2016, and Proxima d, a candidate sub-Earth which orbits very closely to the star, announced in 2022. The existence of Proxima c, a mini-Neptune 1.5 AU away discovered in 2019, is controversial. Alpha Centauri A may have a candidate Neptune-sized planet in the habitable zone, though it is not yet known to be planetary in nature and could be an artifact of the discovery mechanism. Alpha Centauri B has no known planets: planet Bb, purportedly discovered in 2012, was later disproven, and no other planet has yet been confirmed.

Etymology and nomenclature 
α Centauri (Latinised to Alpha Centauri) is the system's designation given by Johann Bayer in 1603. It bears the traditional name Rigil Kentaurus, which is a Latinisation of the Arabic name  Rijl al-Qinṭūrus, meaning 'the Foot of the Centaur'. The name is frequently abbreviated to Rigil Kent or even Rigil, though the latter name is better known for Rigel (Beta Orionis).

An alternative name found in European sources, Toliman, is an approximation of the Arabic  aẓ-Ẓalīmān (in older transcription, aṭ-Ṭhalīmān), meaning 'the (two male) Ostriches', an appellation Zakariya al-Qazwini had applied to Lambda and Mu Sagittarii, also in the southern hemisphere.

A third name that has been used is Bungula. Its origin is not known, but it may have been coined from the Greek letter beta (β) and Latin  'hoof'.

Alpha Centauri C was discovered in 1915 by Robert T. A. Innes, who suggested that it be named Proxima Centaurus, . The name Proxima Centauri later became more widely used and is now listed by the International Astronomical Union (IAU) as the approved proper name.

In 2016, the Working Group on Star Names of the IAU, having decided to attribute proper names to individual component stars rather than to multiple systems, approved the name Rigil Kentaurus as being restricted to Alpha Centauri A and the name Proxima Centauri for Alpha Centauri C. On 10 August 2018, the IAU approved the name Toliman for Alpha Centauri B.

Observation 

To the naked eye, Alpha Centauri AB appears to be a single star, the brightest in the southern constellation of Centaurus. Their apparent angular separation varies over about 80 years between 2 and 22 arcsec (the naked eye has a resolution of 60 arcsec), but through much of the orbit, both are easily resolved in binoculars or small telescopes. At −0.27 apparent magnitude (combined for A and B magnitudes), Alpha Centauri is a first-magnitude star and is fainter only than Sirius and Canopus. It is the outer star of The Pointers or The Southern Pointers, so called because the line through Beta Centauri (Hadar/Agena), some 4.5° west, points to the constellation Crux — the Southern Cross. The Pointers easily distinguish the true Southern Cross from the fainter asterism known as the False Cross.

South of about 29° South latitude, Alpha Centauri is circumpolar and never sets below the horizon. North of about 29° N latitude, Alpha Centauri never rises. Alpha Centauri lies close to the southern horizon when viewed from the 29° North latitude to the equator (close to Hermosillo and Chihuahua City in Mexico; Galveston, Texas; Ocala, Florida; and Lanzarote, the Canary Islands of Spain), but only for a short time around its culmination. The star culminates each year at local midnight on 24 April and at local 9 p.m. on 8 June.

As seen from Earth, Proxima Centauri is 2.2° southwest from Alpha Centauri AB, about four times the angular diameter of the Moon. Proxima Centauri appears as a deep-red star of a typical apparent magnitude of 11.1 in a sparsely populated star field, requiring moderately sized telescopes to be seen. Listed as V645 Cen in the General Catalogue of Variable Stars Version 4.2, this UV Ceti-type flare star can unexpectedly brighten rapidly by as much as 0.6 magnitude at visual wavelengths, then fade after only a few minutes. Some amateur and professional astronomers regularly monitor for outbursts using either optical or radio telescopes. In August 2015, the largest recorded flares of the star occurred, with the star becoming 8.3 times brighter than normal on 13 August, in the B band (blue light region).

Observational history 

Alpha Centauri is listed in the 2nd-century star catalog of Ptolemy. In Ptolemy's time, Alpha Centauri was visible from Alexandria, Egypt, at  but, due to precession, its declination is now , and it can no longer be seen at that latitude. English explorer Robert Hues brought Alpha Centauri to the attention of European observers in his 1592 work Tractatus de Globis, along with Canopus and Achernar, noting:

The binary nature of Alpha Centauri AB was recognized in December 1689 by Jean Richaud, while observing a passing comet from his station in Puducherry. Alpha Centauri was only the second binary star to be discovered, preceded by Acrux.

The large proper motion of Alpha Centauri AB was discovered by Manuel John Johnson, observing from Saint Helena, who informed Thomas Henderson at the Royal Observatory, Cape of Good Hope of it. The parallax of Alpha Centauri was subsequently determined by Henderson from many exacting positional observations of the AB system between April 1832 and May 1833. He withheld his results, however, because he suspected they were too large to be true, but eventually published them in 1839 after Friedrich Wilhelm Bessel released his own accurately determined parallax for 61 Cygni in 1838. For this reason, Alpha Centauri is sometimes considered as the second star to have its distance measured because Henderson's work was not fully acknowledged at first.

Later, John Herschel made the first micrometrical observations in 1834. Since the early 20th century, measures have been made with photographic plates.

By 1926, William Stephen Finsen calculated the approximate orbit elements close to those now accepted for this system. All future positions are now sufficiently accurate for visual observers to determine the relative places of the stars from a binary star ephemeris. Others, like D. Pourbaix (2002), have regularly refined the precision of new published orbital elements.

Robert T. A. Innes discovered Proxima Centauri in 1915 by blinking photographic plates taken at different times during a proper motion survey. These showed large proper motion and parallax similar in both size and direction to those of Alpha Centauri AB, which suggested that Proxima Centauri is part of the Alpha Centauri system and slightly closer to Earth than Alpha Centauri AB. As such, Innes concluded that Proxima Centauri was the closest star to Earth yet discovered.

Kinematics 

All components of Alpha Centauri display significant proper motion against the background sky. Over centuries, this causes their apparent positions to slowly change. Proper motion was unknown to ancient astronomers. Most assumed that the stars were permanently fixed on the celestial sphere, as stated in the works of the philosopher Aristotle. In 1718, Edmond Halley found that some stars had significantly moved from their ancient astrometric positions.

In the 1830s, Thomas Henderson discovered the true distance to Alpha Centauri by analysing his many astrometric mural circle observations. He then realised this system also likely had a high proper motion. In this case, the apparent stellar motion was found using Nicolas Louis de Lacaille's astrometric observations of 1751–1752, by the observed differences between the two measured positions in different epochs.

Calculated proper motion of the centre of mass for Alpha Centauri AB is about 3620 mas/y (milliarcseconds per year) toward the west and 694 mas/y toward the north, giving an overall motion of 3686 mas/y in a direction 11° north of west. The motion of the centre of mass is about 6.1 arcmin each century, or 1.02° each millennium. Using spectroscopy the mean radial velocity has been determined to be around  towards the Solar System.

Since Alpha Centauri AB is almost exactly in the plane of the Milky Way as viewed from Earth, many stars appear behind it. In early May 2028, Alpha Centauri A will pass between the Earth and a distant red star, when there is a 45% probability that an Einstein ring will be observed. Other conjunctions will also occur in the coming decades, allowing accurate measurement of proper motions and possibly giving information on planets.

Predicted future changes 

Based on the system's common proper motion and radial velocities, Alpha Centauri will continue to change its position in the sky significantly and will gradually brighten. For example, in about 6,200 AD, α Centauri's true motion will cause an extremely rare first-magnitude stellar conjunction with Beta Centauri, forming a brilliant optical double star in the southern sky. It will then pass just north of the Southern Cross or Crux, before moving northwest and up towards the present celestial equator and away from the galactic plane. At nearest approach, Alpha Centauri will attain a maximum apparent magnitude of −0.86, comparable to present-day magnitude of Canopus, but it will still not surpass that of Sirius, which will brighten incrementally over the next 60,000 years, and will continue to be the brightest star as seen from Earth (other than the Sun) for the next 210,000 years.

Stellar system 
Alpha Centauri is a triple star system, with its two main stars, Alpha Centauri A and Alpha Centauri B, together comprising a binary component. The AB designation, or older A×B, denotes the mass centre of a main binary system relative to companion star(s) in a multiple star system. AB-C refers to the component of Proxima Centauri in relation to the central binary, being the distance between the centre of mass and the outlying companion. Because the distance between Proxima (C) and either of Alpha Centauri A or B is similar, the AB binary system is sometimes treated as a single gravitational object.

Orbital properties 

The A and B components of Alpha Centauri have an orbital period of 79.762 years. The most recent periastron was in August 1955 and the next will occur in May 2035; the most recent apastron was in May 1995 and will next occur in 2075.

Viewed from Earth, the apparent orbit of A and B means that their separation and position angle (PA) are in continuous change throughout their projected orbit. Observed stellar positions in 2019 are separated by 4.92 arcsec through the PA of 337.1°, increasing to 5.49 arcsec through 345.3° in 2020. The closest recent approach was in February 2016, at 4.0 arcsec through the PA of 300°. The observed maximum separation of these stars is about 22 arcsec, while the minimum distance is 1.7 arcsec. The widest separation occurred during February 1976, and the next will be in January 2056.

Until 2017, measurements of its small speed and its trajectory were of too little accuracy and duration in years to determine whether it is bound to Alpha Centauri AB or unrelated.

Radial velocity measurements made in 2017 were precise enough to show that Proxima Centauri and Alpha Centauri AB are gravitationally bound. The orbital period of Proxima Centauri is approximately  years, with an eccentricity of 0.5, much more eccentric than Mercury's.

Physical properties 

Asteroseismic studies, chromospheric activity, and stellar rotation (gyrochronology) are all consistent with the Alpha Centauri system being similar in age to, or slightly older than, the Sun. Asteroseismic analyses that incorporate tight observational constraints on the stellar parameters for the Alpha Centauri stars have yielded age estimates of  Gyr,  Gyr, 5.2 ± 1.9 Gyr, 6.4 Gyr, and  Gyr. Age estimates for the stars based on chromospheric activity (Calcium H & K emission) yield 4.4 ± 2.1 Gyr, whereas gyrochronology yields  Gyr. Stellar evolution theory implies both stars are slightly older than the Sun at 5 to 6 billion years, as derived by their mass and spectral characteristics.

From the orbital elements, the total mass of Alpha Centauri AB is about  – or twice that of the Sun. Alpha Centauri A and B have absolute magnitudes of +4.38 and +5.71, respectively.

Alpha Centauri AB System

Alpha Centauri A 
Alpha Centauri A, also known as Rigil Kentaurus, is the principal member, or primary, of the binary system. It is a solar-like main-sequence star with a similar yellowish colour, whose stellar classification is spectral type G2-V; it is about 10% more massive than the Sun, with a radius about 22% larger. When considered among the individual brightest stars in the night sky, it is the fourth-brightest at an apparent magnitude of +0.01, being slightly fainter than Arcturus at an apparent magnitude of −0.05.

The type of magnetic activity on Alpha Centauri A is comparable to that of the Sun, showing coronal variability due to star spots, as modulated by the rotation of the star. However, since 2005 the activity level has fallen into a deep minimum that might be similar to the Sun's historical Maunder Minimum. Alternatively, it may have a very long stellar activity cycle and is slowly recovering from a minimum phase.

Alpha Centauri B 
Alpha Centauri B, also known as Toliman, is the secondary star of the binary system. It is a main-sequence star of spectral type K1-V, making it more an orange colour than Alpha Centauri A; it has around 90% of the mass of the Sun and a 14% smaller diameter. Although it has a lower luminosity than A, Alpha Centauri B emits more energy in the X-ray band. Its light curve varies on a short time scale, and there has been at least one observed flare. It is more magnetically active than Alpha Centauri A, showing a cycle of  compared to 11 years for the Sun, and has about half the minimum-to-peak variation in coronal luminosity of the Sun. Alpha Centauri B has an apparent magnitude of +1.35, slightly dimmer than Mimosa.

Alpha Centauri C (Proxima Centauri) 

Alpha Centauri C, better known as Proxima Centauri, is a small main-sequence red dwarf of spectral class M6-Ve. It has an absolute magnitude of +15.60, over 20,000 times fainter than the Sun. Its mass is calculated to be . It is the closest star to the Sun but is too faint to be visible to the naked eye.

Planetary system 
The Alpha Centauri system as a whole has two confirmed planets, both of them around Proxima Centauri. While other planets have been claimed to exist around all of the stars, none of the discoveries have been confirmed.

Planets of Proxima Centauri 

Proxima Centauri b is a terrestrial planet discovered in 2016 by astronomers at the European Southern Observatory (ESO). It has an estimated minimum mass of 1.17  (Earth masses) and orbits approximately 0.049 AU from Proxima Centauri, placing it in the star's habitable zone.

Proxima Centauri c is a planet that was formally published in 2020 and could be a super-Earth or mini-Neptune. In June 2020, a possible direct imaging detection of the planet hinted at the potential presence of a large ring system. However, a 2022 study disputed the existence of this planet.

This planet, Proxima Centauri d, was confirmed in 2022.

Planets of Alpha Centauri A 

In 2021, a candidate planet named Candidate 1 (abbreviated as C1) was detected around Alpha Centauri A, thought to orbit at approximately 1.1 AU with a period of about one year, and to have a mass between that of Neptune and one-half that of Saturn, though it may be a dust disk or an artifact. The possibility of C1 being a background star has been ruled out. If this candidate is confirmed, the temporary name C1 will most likely be replaced with the scientific designation Alpha Centauri Ab in accordance with current naming conventions.

GO Cycle 1 observations are planned for the James Webb Space Telescope (JWST) to search for planets around Alpha Centauri A. The observations are planned to occur at a date between July and August 2023. Pre-launch estimates predicted that JWST will be able to find planets with a radius of 5  at 1–3 au. Multiple observations every 3–6 months could push the limit down to 3 . Post-processing techniques could push the limit down to 0.5 to 0.7 . Post-launch estimates based on observations of HIP 65426 b find that JWST will be able to find planets even closer to Alpha Centauri A and could find a 5  planet at 0.5 to 2.5 au. Candidate 1 has an estimated radius between 3.3 and 11  and orbits at 1.1 au. It is therefore likely within the reach of JWST observations.

Planets of Alpha Centauri B 

In 2012, a planet around Alpha Centauri B was reported, Alpha Centauri Bb, but in 2015 a new analysis concluded that that report was an artifact of the datum analysis.

A possible transit-like event was observed in 2013, which could be associated with a separate planet. This planet would most likely orbit Alpha Centauri B with an orbital period of 20.4 days or less, with only a 5% chance of it having a longer orbit. The median of the likely orbits is 12.4 days. Its orbit would likely have an eccentricity of 0.24 or less. It could have lakes of molten lava and would be far too close to Alpha Centauri B to harbour life. If confirmed, this planet might be called Alpha Centauri Bc. However, the name has not been used in the literature, as it is not a claimed discovery. , it appears that no further transit-like events have been observed.

Hypothetical planets 
Additional planets may exist in the Alpha Centauri system, either orbiting Alpha Centauri A or Alpha Centauri B individually, or in large orbits around Alpha Centauri AB. Because both stars are fairly similar to the Sun (for example, in age and metallicity), astronomers have been especially interested in making detailed searches for planets in the Alpha Centauri system. Several established planet-hunting teams have used various radial velocity or star transit methods in their searches around these two bright stars. All the observational studies have so far failed to find evidence for brown dwarfs or gas giants.

In 2009, computer simulations showed that a planet might have been able to form near the inner edge of Alpha Centauri B's habitable zone, which extends from 0.5 to 0.9 AU from the star. Certain special assumptions, such as considering that the Alpha Centauri pair may have initially formed with a wider separation and later moved closer to each other (as might be possible if they formed in a dense star cluster), would permit an accretion-friendly environment farther from the star. Bodies around Alpha Centauri A would be able to orbit at slightly farther distances due to its stronger gravity. In addition, the lack of any brown dwarfs or gas giants in close orbits around Alpha Centauri make the likelihood of terrestrial planets greater than otherwise.

Radial velocity measurements of Alpha Centauri B made with the High Accuracy Radial Velocity Planet Searcher spectrograph were sufficiently sensitive to detect a  planet within the habitable zone of the star (i.e. with an orbital period P = 200 days), but no planets were detected.

Current estimates place the probability of finding an Earth-like planet around Alpha Centauri at roughly 75%.

Early computer-generated models of planetary formation predicted the existence of terrestrial planets around both Alpha Centauri A and B, but most recent numerical investigations have shown that the gravitational pull of the companion star renders the accretion of planets difficult. Despite these difficulties, given the similarities to the Sun in spectral types, star type, age and probable stability of the orbits, it has been suggested that this stellar system could hold one of the best possibilities for harbouring extraterrestrial life on a potential planet.

In the Solar System, it was once thought that Jupiter and Saturn were probably crucial in perturbing comets into the inner Solar System, providing the inner planets with a source of water and various other ices. However, since isotope measurements of the deuterium to hydrogen (D/H) ratio in comets Halley, Hyakutake, Hale–Bopp, 2002T7, and Tuttle yield values approximately twice that of Earth's oceanic water, more recent models and research predict that less than 10% of Earth's water was supplied from comets. In the Alpha Centauri system, Proxima Centauri may have influenced the planetary disk as the Alpha Centauri system was forming, enriching the area around Alpha Centauri with volatile materials. This would be discounted if, for example, Alpha Centauri B happened to have gas giants orbiting Alpha Centauri A (or vice versa), or if Alpha Centauri A and B themselves were able to perturb comets into each other's inner systems as Jupiter and Saturn presumably have done in the Solar System. Such icy bodies probably also reside in Oort clouds of other planetary systems. When they are influenced gravitationally by either the gas giants or disruptions by passing nearby stars, many of these icy bodies then travel star-wards. Such ideas also apply to the close approach of Alpha Centauri or other stars to the Solar System, when, in the distant future, the Oort Cloud might be disrupted enough to increase the number of active comets.

To be in the habitable zone, a planet around Alpha Centauri A would have an orbital radius of between about 1.2 and  so as to have similar planetary temperatures and conditions for liquid water to exist.

With the goal of finding evidence of such planets, both Proxima Centauri and Alpha Centauri-AB were among the listed "Tier-1" target stars for NASA's Space Interferometry Mission (S.I.M.). Detecting planets as small as three Earth-masses or smaller within two AU of a "Tier-1" target would have been possible with this new instrument. The S.I.M. mission, however, was cancelled due to financial issues in 2010.

Circumstellar discs 
Based on observations between 2007 and 2012, a study found a slight excess of emissions in the 24-µm (mid/far-infrared) band surrounding , which may be interpreted as evidence for a sparse circumstellar disc or dense interplanetary dust. If such a disc existed around both stars,  disc would likely be stable to 2.8 AU, and  would likely be stable to 2.5 AU This would put A's disc entirely within the frost line, and a small part of B's outer disc just outside.

View from this system 

The sky from Alpha Centauri AB would appear much as it does from the Earth, except that Centaurus would be missing its brightest star. The Sun would appear as a white star of apparent magnitude +0.5, roughly the same as the average brightness of Betelgeuse from Earth. With the placement of the Sun east of the magnitude 3.4 star Epsilon Cassiopeiae, nearly in front of the Heart Nebula, the "W" line of stars of Cassiopeia would have a "/W" shape.

The Winter Triangle would not look equilateral, but very thin and long, with Procyon outshining Pollux in the middle of Gemini, and Sirius lying less than a degree from Betelgeuse in Orion. With a magnitude of −1.2, Sirius would be a little fainter than from Earth but still the brightest star in the night sky. Both Vega and Altair would be shifted northwestward relative to Deneb, giving the Summer Triangle a more equilateral appearance.

A planet around either α Centauri A or B would see the other star as a very bright secondary. For example, an Earth-like planet at 1.25 AU from α Cen A (with a revolution period of 1.34 years) would get Sun-like illumination from its primary, and α Cen B would appear 5.7 to 8.6 magnitudes dimmer (−21.0 to −18.2), 190 to 2,700 times dimmer than α Cen A but still 150 to 2,100 times brighter than the full Moon. Conversely, an Earth-like planet at 0.71 AU from α Cen B (with a revolution period of 0.63 years) would get nearly Sun-like illumination from its primary, and α Cen A would appear 4.6 to 7.3 magnitudes dimmer (−22.1 to −19.4), 70 to 840 times dimmer than α Cen B but still 470 to 5,700 times brighter than the full Moon.

Proxima Centauri would appear dim as one of many stars.

Other names 
In modern literature, colloquial alternative names of Alpha Centauri include Rigil Kent (also Rigel Kent and variants) and Toliman (the latter of which became the proper name of Alpha Centauri B on 10 August 2018 by approval of the International Astronomical Union).

Rigil Kent is short for Rigil Kentaurus, which is sometimes further abbreviated to Rigil or Rigel, though that is ambiguous with Beta Orionis, which is also called Rigel.

The name Toliman originates with Jacobus Golius' 1669 edition of Al-Farghani's Compendium. Tolimân is Golius' latinisation of the Arabic name   "the ostriches", the name of an asterism of which Alpha Centauri formed the main star.

During the 19th century, the northern amateur popularist Elijah H. Burritt used the now-obscure name Bungula, possibly coined from "β" and the Latin ungula ("hoof").

Together, Alpha and Beta Centauri form the "Southern Pointers" or "The Pointers", as they point towards the Southern Cross, the asterism of the constellation of Crux.

In Chinese astronomy,  Nán Mén, meaning Southern Gate, refers to an asterism consisting of Alpha Centauri and Epsilon Centauri. Consequently, the Chinese name for Alpha Centauri itself is  Nán Mén Èr, the Second Star of the Southern Gate.

To the Australian aboriginal Boorong people of northwestern Victoria, Alpha Centauri and Beta Centauri are Bermbermgle, two brothers noted for their courage and destructiveness, who speared and killed Tchingal "The Emu" (the Coalsack Nebula). The form in Wotjobaluk is Bram-bram-bult.

Future exploration 

Alpha Centauri is a first target for crewed or robotic interstellar exploration. Using current spacecraft technologies, crossing the distance between the Sun and Alpha Centauri would take several millennia, though the possibility of nuclear pulse propulsion or laser light sail technology, as considered in the Breakthrough Starshot program, could make the journey to Alpha Centauri in 20 years. An objective of such a mission would be to make a fly-by of, and possibly photograph, planets that might exist in the system. The existence of Proxima Centauri b, announced by the European Southern Observatory (ESO) in August 2016, would be a target for the Starshot program.

NASA announced in 2017 that it plans to send a spacecraft to Alpha Centauri in 2069, scheduled to coincide with the 100th anniversary of the first crewed lunar landing in 1969, Apollo 11. Even at speed 10% of the speed of light (67 million mph), which NASA experts say may be possible, it would take a spacecraft 44 years to reach the constellation, by the year 2113, and will take another 4 years for a signal, by the year 2117 to reach Earth.

Historical distance estimates

See also 
 Alpha Centauri in fiction
 List of nearest stars and brown dwarfs
 Project Longshot
 Sagan Planet Walk

Notes

References

External links 

 SIMBAD observational data
 Sixth Catalogue of Orbits of Visual Binary Stars U.S.N.O.
 The Imperial Star – Alpha Centauri
 Alpha Centauri – A Voyage to Alpha Centauri
 Immediate History of Alpha Centauri
 eSky: Alpha Centauri

Hypothetical planets or exploration 
 
 Alpha Centauri System
 O Sistema Alpha Centauri (Portuguese) 
 Alpha Centauri – Associação de Astronomia (Portuguese)
 

 
G-type main-sequence stars
K-type main-sequence stars
M-type main-sequence stars
Centauri, Alpha
Maunder Minimum
Triple star systems
Hypothetical planetary systems
Centaurus (constellation)
Rigil Kentaurus
Centauri, Alpha
PD-60 05483
0559
128620 and 128621
071681 and 071683
5759 and 5760
Articles containing video clips
16891215
Astronomical objects known since antiquity